Political ecology is the study of the relationships between political, economic and social factors with environmental issues and changes. Political ecology differs from apolitical ecological studies by politicizing environmental issues and phenomena.

The academic discipline offers wide-ranging studies integrating ecological social sciences with political economy in topics such as degradation and marginalization, environmental conflict, conservation and control, and environmental identities and social movements.

Origins

The term "political ecology" was first coined by Frank Thone in an article published in 1935. It has been widely used since then in the context of human geography and human ecology, but with no systematic definition. Anthropologist Eric R. Wolf gave it a second life in 1972 in an article entitled "Ownership and Political Ecology", in which he discusses how local rules of ownership and inheritance "mediate between the pressures emanating from the larger society and the exigencies of the local ecosystem", but did not develop the concept further. Other origins include other early works of Eric R. Wolf, Michael J. Watts, Susanna Hecht, and others in the 1970s and 1980s.

The origins of the field in the 1970s and 1980s were a result of the development of development geography and cultural ecology, particularly the work of Piers Blaikie on the sociopolitical origins of soil erosion. Historically, political ecology has focused on phenomena in and affecting the developing world; since the field's inception, "research has sought primarily to understand the political dynamics surrounding material and discursive struggles over the environment in the third world".

Scholars in political ecology are drawn from a variety of academic disciplines, including geography, anthropology, development studies, political science, economics, sociology, forestry, and environmental history.

Overview
Political ecology's broad scope and interdisciplinary nature lends itself to multiple definitions and understandings. However, common assumptions across the field give the term relevance. Raymond L. Bryant and Sinéad Bailey developed three fundamental assumptions in practising political ecology:

 First, changes in the environment do not affect society in a homogenous way: political, social, and economic differences account for uneven distribution of costs and benefits.
 Second,  "any change in environmental conditions must affect the political and economic status quo."
 Third, the unequal distribution of costs and benefits and the reinforcing or reducing of pre-existing inequalities has political implications in terms of the altered power relationships that then result.

In addition, political ecology attempts to provide critiques and alternatives in the interplay of the environment and political, economic and social factors. Paul Robbins asserts that the discipline has a "normative understanding that there are very likely better, less coercive, less exploitative, and more sustainable ways of doing things".

From these assumptions, political ecology can be used to:
 inform policymakers and organizations of the complexities surrounding environment and development, thereby contributing to better environmental governance.
 understand the decisions that communities make about the natural environment in the context of their political environment, economic pressure, and societal regulations
 look at how unequal relations in and among societies affect the natural environment, especially in context of government policy.

Scope and influences

Political ecology's movement as a field since its inception in the 1970s has complicated its scope and goals. Through the discipline's history, certain influences have grown more and less influential in determining the focus of study. Peter A. Walker traces the importance of the ecological sciences in political ecology.  He points to the transition, for many critics, from a ‘structuralist’ approach through the 1970s and 1980s, in which ecology maintains a key position in the discipline, to a 'poststructuralist' approach with an emphasis on the 'politics' in political ecology. This turn has raised questions as to the differentiation with environmental politics as well as the field's use of the term of 'ecology'. Political ecological research has shifted from investigating political influence on the earth's surface to the focus on spatial-ecological influences on politics and power—a scope reminiscent of environmental politics.

Much has been drawn from cultural ecology, a form of analysis that showed how culture depends upon, and is influenced by, the material conditions of society (political ecology has largely eclipsed cultural ecology as a form of analysis according to Walker.) As Walker states, "whereas cultural ecology and systems theory emphasize[s] adaptation and homeostasis, political ecology emphasize[s] the role of political economy as a force of maladaptation and instability".

Political ecologists often use political economy frameworks to analyze environmental issues. Early and prominent examples of this were Silent Violence: Food, Famine and Peasantry in Northern Nigeria by Michael Watts in 1983, which traced the famine in northern Nigeria during the 1970s to the effects of colonialism, rather than an inevitable consequence of the drought in the Sahel, and The Political Economy of Soil Erosion in Developing Countries by Piers Blaikie in 1985, which traced land degradation in Africa to colonial policies of land appropriation, rather than over-exploitation by African farmers.

Relationship to anthropology and geography

Originating in the 18th and 19th centuries with philosophers such as Adam Smith, Karl Marx, and Thomas Malthus, political economy attempted to explain the relationships between economic production and political processes. It tended toward overly structuralist explanations, focusing on the role of individual economic relationships in the maintenance of social order. Eric Wolf used political economy in a neo-Marxist framework which began addressing the role of local cultures as a part of the world capitalist system, refusing to see those cultures as "primitive isolates". But environmental effects on political and economic processes were under-emphasised.

Conversely, Julian Steward and Roy Rappaport's theories of cultural ecology are sometimes credited with shifting the functionalist-oriented anthropology of the 1950s and 1960s and incorporating ecology and environment into ethnographic study.

Geographers and anthropologists worked with the strengths of both to form the basis of political ecology. PE focuses on issues of power, recognizing the importance of explaining environmental impacts on cultural processes without separating out political and economic contexts.

The application of political ecology in the work of anthropologists and geographers differs. While any approach will take both the political/economic and the ecological into account, the emphasis can be unequal. Some, such as geographer Michael Watts, focus on how the assertion of power impacts on access to environmental resources. His approach tends to see environmental harm as both a cause and an effect of “social marginalization”.

Political ecology has strengths and weaknesses. At its core, it contextualizes political and ecological explanations of human behavior. But as Walker points out, it has failed to offer “compelling counter-narratives” to “widely influential and popular yet deeply flawed and unapologetic neo-Malthusian rants such as Robert Kaplan's (1994) 'The coming anarchy' and Jared Diamond's (2005) Collapse (385). Ultimately, applying political ecology to policy decisions – especially in the US and Western Europe – will remain problematic as long as there is a resistance to Marxist and neo-Marxist theory.

Andrew Vayda and Bradley Walters (1999) criticize political ecologists for pre-supposing “the importance ... of certain kinds of political factors in the explanation of environmental changes” (167). Vayda and Walter's response to overly political approaches in political ecology is to encourage what they call “event ecology”, focusing on human responses to environmental events without presupposing the impact of political processes on environmental events. The critique has not been taken up widely. One example of work that builds on event ecology, in order to add a more explicit focus on the role of power dynamics and the need for including local peoples' voices is Penna-Firme (2013) "Political and Event Ecology: critiques and opportunities for collaboration".

Relationship to conservation

There is a divergence of ideas between conservation science and political ecology. With conservationists establishing protected areas to conserve biodiversity, "political ecologists have devoted some energy to the study of protected areas, which is unsurprising given political ecology's overall interest in forms of access to, and control over resources". The arguments against enclosure of land for conservation is that it harms local people and their livelihood systems, by denying them access. As Dove and Carpenter state, "indigenous people have important environmental knowledge which could contribute to conservation". The objection by political ecologists is that land use regulations are made by NGOs and the government, denying access, denying the ability of local people to conserve species and areas themselves, and rendering them more vulnerable through dispossession.

Power perspective in political ecology 
Power is inevitable at the core of political ecology. Political ecology in the view Greenberg and Park is a way of creating a synergy between a political economy that aligns power distribution with ecological analysis and economic activities in a wider version of bio-environmental relations. Political ecology explained by Bryant is the dynamic in politics that is associated with "discursive struggle" and material in the environment of less developed nations, showing how unequal relation in power makes up a political environment. In the view of Robbins, empirical exploration that shows the changes occurring in an environment in clear connection to power is termed political ecology. 

With power taking the central role in political ecology, there is a need to clarify the perspectives of power and the contributors to these perspectives.

Actor-oriented power perspectives: 
According to the actor-oriented power perspectives, power is exercised by actors which are contrary to the presumption of power being perceived as a force likely to pass individuals with no consciousness. Fredrick Engelstad, a Norwegian sociologist explained the concept of power as the combination of relationality, causality, and intentionality. The implication of this is that actors are perceived as power carriers in a significant way by which through action a certain intention (intentionality) is achieved, action occurs between at least two actors (relationality), and intended results are produced by action (causality). Viewing the power perspective from the angle of actor-oriented, Dowding submitted that power is linked to the agency, and this does not take away the importance of structure. Rather, while seen actor's use of power as a constraint, it is also propelled by structures. 

The contributions made by actor-oriented power theory are given by Max Weber (1964) where he explained power to be people’s ability to the realization of their wills irrespective of the resistance posed by others. An instance given by Robert Dahl is the case where actor A exercises power over actor B by getting actor B to execute a task that actor B will otherwise not do. The extreme case of this is when some group of individuals is mandated to carry out the task contrary to their thought or will. 

Svarstad, Benjaminsen, and Overå held that the theory of actor-oriented power help in providing conceptual distinctions with useful insight into the theoretical elements that are vital in studying political ecology. While there are actors who either exercise or try to put power into use in diverse ways, there are also actors who encounter resistance from their oppositions and other forces. An instance of these forces is the resisting the fulfilment of actors' intentions by other opposition who are more powerful. It can also come in the form of institutional structural constraints emanating from the outcome of intended actions. 

The use of power by actors who exercise environmental interventions and actors who resist such interventions are oftentimes the emphasis of scholars of political ecology. However, when environmental interventions result in environmental degradations, scholars of political ecology throw their support to actors who resist such exercise of environmental interventions. Actors exercising environmental interventions include corporate organizations, governmental and non-governmental organizations  while actors that resist them include groups such as peasants, fishermen, or pastoralists, by exercising counter-power using various kinds of resistance, or active involvement. 

Neo-Marxist power perspectives

Amongst the foundations of political ecology is the political economy thought of Marxist which centered on the inequalities that emerged from global capitalism. However, the power perspectives of Marx are most likely highlighted even though there are several perspectives of power in political ecology influenced directly or indirectly by Marx.  The Marxist main focus under capitalism is in relation to class and the stability of reproducing this class relation. Marx also placed human agency as the most important of his power concept with the human agency being socially conditioned as seen in his quote below:

"Men make their history, but they do not make it as they please; they do not make it under self-selected circumstances, but under circumstances existing already, given and transmitted from the past (Marx 1852:5)".

Thus, Marx's power theory which formed his perspective of power is the understanding of human agency as being constrained by social structure. As structure produces the potential and extent for power exertion, the human agency is reproducing the structure. This is illustrated by Isaac (1987) using the powerful David Rockefeller (1915 to 2017). is quoted below:

"But a social theory of power must explain what kinds of social relations exist and how power is distributed by these relations, such that it is possible for David Rockefeller to have the power that he has. To do this is not to deny that it is he who possesses this power, nor to deny those personal attributes determining the particular manner in which he exercises it. It is simply to insist that the power individuals possess has social conditions of existence and that it is these conditions that should be the primary focus of theoretical analysis".

Poststructuralist power perspectives 

The poststructuralist power perspective is the domain of Michel Foucault’s work with its application in political ecology. The poststructuralist power perspectives can be in three dimensions such as; biopower, governmentality, and discursive power. 

Biopower indicates that to secure life, governments are concerned with the improvement of health and quality of life among populations. Foucault in his work explained how through the knowledge of power, people have learned how they should behave. In so doing, Foucault separates sovereign power from bio-power. Where sovereign power is termed "take life or let live", the bio-power "make life or let die". While human as specie is continuously elaboration in conformity to nature, the superior one will intervene, acting on the environmental condition if the species of human are to be altered. Therefore, bio-power aim in terms of governance and knowledge is to ascertain environmental issues as core concerns. 

Political ecology emphasized that understanding how power works in environmental governance follows Foucault’s notion of “governmentality”.   Foucault sees governmentality as the means employed by the government to make its citizens behave in line with the priorities of government. Fletcher separates governmentality into four kinds. First is "discipline" which ensures that the citizens internalize specific manners like ethical standards and social norms. The second is the "truth" which is a way of governing citizens using truth-defining standards like religion. The third is "Neoliberal rationality" which is a motivational structure formed and used to improve outcomes. The fourth is "Sovereign power" used to govern based on rules and punishment for faulting the rules. According to Fletcher, these governmentalities may conflict, work alone, or overlap. Also, the first two are dependent on humans believing government priorities, the second two do not but are seen as of importance. 

Lastly, "discursive power" manifest when actors (corporate organization, governmental, and non-governmental organizations) make people or groups imbibe and add to the reproduction of the discourses they produce. Unlike in other fields, in political ecology, discourses are studied in line with a critical realist epistemology.    There are instances where the formation of discursive power is traced to a state’s colonial era when efforts are made in the appropriation of new territories. Going by the basis of Foucault's political-ecological discursive power, it becomes imperative to mention that, there exist various perspectives to those of Foucault with wider space for human agency. 

Comparing between bio-power, governmentality, and discursive power, both governmentality, and discursive power can be regarded as a theoretical perspective with significant importance while bio-power can be regarded as a topical concern identified by Foucault as the core of modern-day governments.

Political ecologists
Some prominent contemporary scholars include:

 Anthony Bebbington
 Piers Blaikie
 Murray Bookchin
 Harold Brookfield
 Raymond L. Bryant
 Michael R. Dove
 Robyn Eckersley
Arturo Escobar
 Andre Gorz
 Félix Guattari
 Susanna Hecht
 Ivan Illich
 Giorgos Kallis
 Alain Lipietz
 William Moseley
 Richard Peet
 Paul Robbins
 Ariel Salleh
 Farhana Sultana
 Erik Swyngedouw
 Bhaskar Vira
Michael Watts
 Karl Zimmerer

Related journals
Scholarly journals that have been key to the development (and critique) of this field include:

 Annals of the Association of American Geographers
 Antipode
 Capitalism Nature Socialism
 Development and Change
 Journal of Peasant Studies
 Ecological Economics
 Ecology
 Economic Geography
 Environment and Planning
 Futures
 Gender, Place & Culture
 Geoforum
 Human Ecology
 Journal of Political Ecology
 New Left Review
 Progress in Human Geography
 Progress in Physical Geography
 Oryx (journal)

See also

 Agroecology
 Criticism of capitalism
 Cultural ecology
 Development geography
 Ecofeminism
 Ecological crisis
 Eco-socialism
 Ecogovernmentality
 Environmental justice
 Environmental Politics
 Environmental racism
 Environmental sociology
 Feminist political ecology
 Green nationalism
 Human behavioral ecology
 List of ecology topics
 Political economy
 Social ecology

References

Notes

Bibliography

 Blaikie, P., and Brookfield, H. Land Degradation and Society. Methuen: 1987.
 Blaikie, Piers. 1985. The Political Economy of Soil Erosion in Developing Countries. London; New York: Longman.
 Bryant, Raymond L. 1998. Power, knowledge and political ecology in the third world: a review, Progress in Physical Geography 22(1):79-94.
 Bryant, R. (ed.) 2015. International Handbook of Political Ecology. Edward Elgar
 Bryant, Raymond L. and Sinead Bailey. 1997. Third World Political Ecology. Routledge.
 Dove, Michael R., and Carol Carpenter, eds. 2008. Environmental Anthropology: A Historical Reader. MA: Blackwell.
 Escobar, Arturo. 1996. “Construction Nature: elements for a post-structuralist political ecology”. Futures 28(4): 325-343.
 Garí, Josep A. 2000. The Political Ecology of Biodiversity: Biodiversity conservation and rural development at the indigenous and peasant grassroots. D.Phil. Dissertation, University of Oxford. British Library No. 011720099 (DSC D213318).
 Garí, Josep A. 2000. La ecología política de la biodiversidad. Ecología Política 20: 15-24.
 Greenberg, James B. and Thomas K. Park. 1994. Political Ecology, Journal of Political Ecology 1: 1-12.
 Hecht, Susanna & Alexander Cockburn. 1990 [Updated edition 2010]. Fate of the Forest: Developers, Destroyers, and Defenders of the Amazon. University of Chicago Press.
 Hershkovitz, Linda. 1993. Political Ecology and Environmental Management in the Loess Plateau, China, Human Ecology 21(4): 327-353.
 Martinez-Alier, Joan. 2002. The Environmentalism of the Poor: A Study of Ecological Conflicts and Valuation. Edward Elgar.
 Milstein, T. & Castro-Sotomayor, J. 2020. "Routledge Handbook of Ecocultural Identity." London, UK: Routledge. https://doi.org/10.4324/9781351068840</ref>
Paulson, Susan, Lisa L. Gezon, and Michael Watts. 2003. Locating the Political in Political Ecology: An Introduction, Human Organization 62(3): 205-217.
 Peet, Richard and Michael Watts. 1993. Introduction: Development Theory and Environment in an Age of Market Triumphalism, Economic Geography 68(3): 227-253.
 Peet, Richard, Paul Robbins, and Michael Watts. (eds.) 2011. Global Political Ecology. Routledge.
 Peet, Richard and Michael Watts. eds. 1996. Liberation ecologies: environment, development, social movements. Routledge.
 Peluso, Nancy Lee. 1992. Rich Forests, Poor People: Resource Control and Resistance in Java. University of California Press.
 Peluso Nancy Lee & Michael Watts (eds.). 2001. Violent Environments. Cornell University Press.
 Perreault, T., G. Bridge and J. McCarthy (eds.). 2015. Routledge Handbook of Political Ecology. Routledge.
 Perry, Richard J. 2003. Five Key Concepts in Anthropological Thinking. Upper Saddle River, NJ: Prentice Hall.
 Ritzer, George. 2008. Modern Sociological Theory. Boston: McGraw-Hill.
 Robbins, Paul. 2012. Political Ecology: A Critical Introduction. 2nd ed. Blackwell.
 Rocheleau, D. 1995. Gender and a Feminist Political Ecology Perspective, IDS Institute for Development Studies 26(1): 9-16.
 Salleh, Ariel (ed.) 2009. Eco-Sufficiency & Global Justice: Women write Political Ecology. London: Pluto Press.
 Salleh, Ariel. 2017. Ecofeminism in Clive Spash (ed.) Routledge Handbook of Ecological Economics. London: Routledge.
 Sayre, Nathan. 2002. Species of Capital: Ranching, Endangered Species, and Urbanization in the Southwest. University of Arizona Press.
 Sutton, Mark Q. and E. N. Anderson. 2004. Introduction to Cultural Ecology. Altamira.
 Vayda, Andrew P. and Bradley B. Walters. 1999. Against Political Ecology, Human Ecology 27(1): 167-179.
 Walker, Peter A. 2005. Political ecology: where is the ecology? Progress in Human Geography 29(1):73–82.
 Watts, Michael. 1983 [reprinted 2013]. Silent Violence: Food, Famine and Peasantry in Northern Nigeria. University of California Press.
 Watts, Michael. 2000. “Political Ecology.” In Sheppard, E. and T. Barnes (eds.), A Companion to Economic Geography. Blackwell.
 Walker, Peter A. 2006. Political ecology: where is the policy? Progress in Human Geography 30(3): 382-395.
 Wolf, Eric. 1972. Ownership and Political Ecology, Anthropological Quarterly 45(3): 201-205.

External links
 Cultural and Political Ecology Specialty Group of the Association of American Geographers. Archive of newsletters, officers, award and honor recipients, as well as other resources associated with this community of scholars.

 
Ecology
Anthropology
Political geography
Ecology terminology
Environmental policy
Human-Environment interaction